Alchorneae is a tribe of plants in the subfamily Acalyphoideae, under the family Euphorbiaceae. It comprises 2 subtribes and 7 genera.

See also
Taxonomy of the Euphorbiaceae

 
Euphorbiaceae tribes